The unitary authorities of Durham and Borough of Darlington are combined for the purpose of parliamentary constituency boundaries, being divided into 7 parliamentary constituencies– 1 borough constituency and 6 county constituencies. Since the 2019 general election, 4 parliamentary seats are controlled by the Conservative Party and 3 by the Labour Party. Between 1992 and 2019, all 7 seats were held by the Labour Party. With the exception of Darlington, all seats in the current ceremonial county or their predecessors had returned Labour MPs since 1935.

Constituencies

2010 boundary changes

Under the Fifth Periodic Review of Westminster constituencies, the Boundary Commission for England decided to retain Durham's constituencies for the 2010 election, making minor changes to realign constituency boundaries with the boundaries of current local government wards.

Proposed boundary changes 
See 2023 Periodic Review of Westminster constituencies for further details.

Following the abandonment of the Sixth Periodic Review (the 2018 review), the Boundary Commission for England formally launched the 2023 Review on 5 January 2021. Initial proposals were published on 8 June 2021 and, following two periods of public consultation, revised proposals were published on 8 November 2022. Final proposals will be published by 1 July 2023.

The commission has proposed that the unitary authority of County Durham be combined with the Tyne and Wear boroughs of Gateshead, South Tyneside and Sunderland as a sub-region of the North East Region, with the creation of a cross-county boundary constituency named Blaydon and Consett, resulting in the abolition of North West Durham. It is proposed that the reconfigured Sedgefield constituency is renamed Newton Aycliffe and Spennymoor. Darlington would be included in a Tees Valley sub-division. The following seats are proposed:

Containing electoral wards in Darlington

Darlington
Stockton West (part also in Stockton-on-Tees)
Containing electoral wards in County Durham
Bishop Auckland
Blaydon and Consett (part also in Gateshead in Tyne and Wear)
City of Durham
Easington
Newton Aycliffe and Spennymoor
North Durham

Results history 
Primary data source: House of Commons research briefing - General election results from 1918 to 2019

2019 
The number of votes cast for each political party who fielded candidates in constituencies comprising Durham in the 2019 general election were as follows:

Percentage votes 

11983 & 1987 - SDP-Liberal Alliance

* Included in Other

Seats

Maps

Historical results by party
A cell marked → (with a different colour background to the preceding cell) indicates that the previous MP continued to sit under a new party name.

1885 to 1918

1victor in January 1910, Christopher Furness, declared void. Fresh by-election held June 1910, won by Stephen Furness.

1918 to 1950

1950 to 1983

1983 to present

See also 
 List of parliamentary constituencies in Cleveland for Hartlepool and Stockton-on-Tees from 1983.
 List of parliamentary constituencies in the North East (region)

Notes

References

Durham
Politics of County Durham
Parliamentary constituencies